Melvin Deontae Oliver (born July 25, 1983) is a former American football defensive end who played one season in the National Football League (NFL). He played college football at LSU and was drafted by the San Francisco 49ers in the sixth round of the 2006 NFL Draft.

References

External links
LSU Tigers bio
San Francisco 49ers bio

1983 births
Living people
Sportspeople from Auburn, Alabama
Players of American football from Alabama
American football defensive tackles
LSU Tigers football players
San Francisco 49ers players